Abuzar (also Romanized as Abūz̄ar) is a village in Veysian Rural District, Veysian District, Dowreh County, Lorestan Province, Iran. At the 2006 census, its population was 112, in 27 families.

References 

Towns and villages in Dowreh County